The 1955 World Table Tennis Championships women's singles was the 22nd edition of the women's singles championship.
Angelica Rozeanu defeated Ermelinde Rumpler-Wertl in the final by three sets to nil, to win a sixth consecutive title.

Results

See also
List of World Table Tennis Championships medalists

References

-
1955 in women's table tennis